Annette Winkler is a German business executive who was the CEO and director of Smart Automobile, the division of Daimler AG noted for manufacturing and marketing the two-passenger Smart Fortwo and four-passenger Smart Forfour city cars, from 2011 to 2018.

As the first woman to head a Daimler brand, Automotive News Europe described Winkler's 2010 appointment as "a significant victory for women in a male-dominated industry".

in early 2018, Daimler announced Winkler retirement as the division’s CEO at the end of September, 2018 after 23 years with the company. She was appointed as a member of the advisory board of Mercedes-Benz South Africa as of January 2019.

Background
Born in Wiesbaden, West Germany in 1959,  Winkler completed training as an industrial clerk and thereafter an internship at the Karlsberg brewery in  Homburg, Saarland. From 1980 to 1984 she studied in Frankfurt; received a degree in economics; completed her doctorate in business administration; and completed her thesis on corporate valuation and jurisprudence at the Goethe University Frankfurt.

Career
At age 27 and upon her father's retirement, Winkler assumed the sole management of his construction company, A. Winkler Sohn GmbH & Co. KG, a family-owned business since 1824. Sales increased  from 4 to 60 million euros under her direction. She was named the 1992 Entrepreneur of the Year by champagne house Veuve Clicquot. Six months after leaving her father's construction company, it was in receivership.

Daimler CEO Dieter Zetsche first met Winkler in 1995 at a convention in Stuttgart, where she stood out as a particularly strong speaker. Though she had no prior automotive or publicity experience, Daimler appointed Winkler that same year to head public relations and communications for Mercedes-Benz (1995–1997).

Winkler went on to head a Mercedes-Benz commercial truck dealership in Brunswick (1997–1999) — where she learned and become licensed to drive heavy trucks in nine days, in order to better understand the needs of her customers. She subsequently became CEO of Daimler (then DaimlerChrysler) of Belgium and Luxembourg (1999–2005) and after that the Vice President of Global Business Management & Wholesale Europe (2005–2010). In 2010, succeeding Ulrich Walker, Winkler was appointed CEO of Smart, just as the brand was falling below the critical 100,000 annual sales figure and faced renewed competition with the Audi A1 and Fiat 500.

Winkler currently oversees co-development with Renault of the forthcoming third generation Smart Fortwo (C453/W453 build series), indicating the vehicle will retain the rear-engine configuration, overall length as well as its hemispherical steel safety cell, marketed as the Tridion cell.

Also, under Winkler's direction, Smart has focused on car sharing and rental programs — namely Daimler AG's Car2Go subsidiary — as well as development and marketing of electric bicycles.

As of 2014, Winkler sits on the board of directors at Air Liquide, a French multinational company which supplies industrial gases and services to various industries, and is a Member of the Counsel for Foreign Economic Affairs of the German Ministry for Economics.

Personal
Growing up, Winkler was a classical music aficionado, played the piano, and at one time considered starting a concert agency.  Since 1992, she has been married to an attorney.  Winkler speaks fluent German, English, Dutch and French and is an avid bicyclist, having cycled many of the prominent mountain passes of the Tour de France.

Winkler drives a Fortwo Brabus or Fortwo Electric Drive and as of 2012 still owned a Smart fortwo she purchased in 2000 while living in Brussels, when she had been the head of Daimler of Belgium. Colleagues describe her as a "ständig aufgeladene Batterie" — a battery that's always fully charged.

References

1959 births
Living people
Chief executives in the automobile industry
Women corporate executives
Mercedes-Benz Group executives
DaimlerChrysler
Air Liquide people
20th-century German businesspeople
21st-century German businesspeople
People from Wiesbaden
Goethe University Frankfurt alumni